Alphabet Soup is a Canadian children's television series which aired on CBC Television between October 5, 1971, and December 4, 1973. Each week, Trudy Young, Marc Stone, Lynn Griffin and puppet Arbuckle the Alligator would invite a guest who would talk about a subject beginning with a letter of the week.

Occasional guest Mavis Kerr, a science educator/entertainer at the Ontario Science Centre in Toronto, joined the team when Lynn Griffin became ill.

External links
 Queen's University Directory of CBC Television Series (Alphabet Soup archived listing link via archive.org)
 Alphabet Soup at TVArchive.ca

1970s Canadian children's television series
1971 Canadian television series debuts
1973 Canadian television series endings
Canadian television shows featuring puppetry
CBC Television original programming
Canadian preschool education television series